The Russian Democratic Reform Movement (RDDR, Rossiyskoye dvizheniye demokraticheskikh reform) was a political party in Russia.

History
The party was established in 1991 by Alexander Yakovlev, Arkady Volsky, Anatoly Sobchak, Eduard Shevardnadze and Gavriil Kharitonovich Popov. In the 1993 parliamentary elections it received 4.1% of the proportional representation vote, failing to cross the electoral threshold. However, it won eight constituency seats in the State Duma.

It did not contest any further elections.

References

Defunct political parties in Russia
Political parties established in 1991
1991 establishments in Russia